The Cedar Lounge Revolution is an Irish political weblog started in June 2006.

Foundation and name
The blog was started in June 2006 by "Worldbystorm" a former member of the Workers' Party and Democratic Left and a group of other individuals on politics.ie. The name is believed to have originated from the name of a pub "The Cedar Lounge" in Raheny, Dublin.

Content
The site contains news, debate and analysis from a left wing perspective.

The blog also contains a "Left archive", which is an archive of pamphlets and documents from various historical and current Irish left wing political parties.

Awards
The blog won the Best Irish political blog award in 2009 and 2011

References

External links
The Cedar Lounge Revolution - website

Internet properties established in 2006
Irish political websites